Tuek Chour is a khum (commune) of Preah Netr Preah District in Banteay Meanchey Province in north-western Cambodia.

Villages

 Smach
 Paoy Char
 Ta Khaek
 Kouk kei
 Tonloab
 Kouk Tiem
 Char Leu
 Kantuot
 Thmei
 Kandal
 Tuek Chour
 Ta Siev
 Kampong Thkov
 Ta Pon
 Svay L'a
 Ta Daek
 Samraong
 Anlong Vil

References

Communes of Banteay Meanchey province
Preah Netr Preah District